Cattle Creek Campground, also known as Cattle Creek United Methodist Church and Campground, is a historic camp meeting ground that is now a national historic district located near Rowesville, Orangeburg County, South Carolina. The district encompasses 37 contributing buildings and 1 contributing site.  It was founded in 1786, although this date has been challenged. The campground burned in 1898 and was rebuilt.  Another fire in 2017 destroyed 15 "tents," which were again rebuilt. It includes 36 cabins, called “tents,” arranged in a wide semi-circle.  They are located around an open, 56 feet by 81 feet, pavilion structure known as the “stand” or “tabernacle.” Also located on the property is a cemetery.  It is one of three remaining Methodist campgrounds in South Carolina.

It was added to the National Register of Historic Places in 1983.

See also 
 Camp Welfare: AME Zion camp meeting ground in Fairfield County, South Carolina
 Cypress Camp Ground: Methodist camp meeting ground in Dorchester County, South Carolina
 Indian Fields Campground: Methodist camp meeting ground in Dorchester County, South Carolina
 Mount Carmel Campground: AME Zion camp meeting ground in Lancaster County, South Carolina
 St. Paul Camp Ground: AME camp meeting ground in Dorchester County, South Carolina

References

Properties of religious function on the National Register of Historic Places in South Carolina
Historic districts on the National Register of Historic Places in South Carolina
1899 establishments in South Carolina
Buildings and structures in Orangeburg County, South Carolina
National Register of Historic Places in Orangeburg County, South Carolina
Campgrounds in South Carolina
Methodism in South Carolina
United Methodist Church
Camp meeting grounds